Kletskov is a Russian masculine surname, its feminine counterpart is Kletskova. Notable people with the surname include:

Aleksandr Kletskov (born 1985), Uzbekistani footballer
Natalia Kletskova, Russian paralympic athlete 

Russian-language surnames